Ahlam is a village in Ahlamerestaq-e Shomali Rural District, in the Central District of Mahmudabad County, Mazandaran Province, Iran. At the 2006 census, its population was 1,546, in 419 families. In the middle ages, Ahlam was a small town that served as the port of Amol. It was called "‘Ayn al-Humm" by some medieval authors; Yaqut al-Hamawi wrote the name as "Ahlum".

References 

Populated places in Mahmudabad County